Ali Ravaghi (in Persian:علی رواقی - born 29 November 1941, Mashhad, Iran) is a master and professor emeritus of Persian literature, Qur'an researcher, and a member of the Academy of Persian Language and Literature.

References

Members of the Academy of Persian Language and Literature
1941 births
Living people
Shahnameh Researchers
Faculty of Letters and Humanities of the University of Tehran alumni
People from Mashhad